Brady is a census-designated place and unincorporated community in Pondera County, Montana, United States. Its population was 140 as of the 2010 census. Brady has a post office with ZIP code 59416. The community is located along Interstate 15.

The post office was established in 1910. The town is likely named for the Brady brothers. Charles A. Brady was a physician and Thomas E. Brady was an attorney.

Brady is a grain marketing and distribution center.

Demographics

Climate
According to the Köppen Climate Classification system, Brady has a semi-arid climate, abbreviated "BSk" on climate maps.

Education
The Dutton/Brady Public School, located in Dutton educates students from kindergarten through 12th grade.

Notable person
George Montgomery, actor known for his roles in Westerns

References

Census-designated places in Pondera County, Montana